Kortik (Ко́ртик) may be
the Russian for naval dirk
a nickname for Kashtan CIWS, a weapons system of the Russian navy
a 1948 children's book by Anatoly Rybakov, translated into English as The Dirk
Kortik (1954 film), an adaptation of Rybakov's book, by Vladimir Vengerov and Michael Schweitzer
Kortik (1973 film), an adaptation of Rybakov's book for TV by Nikolai Kalinin